The Joiner House is a historic house at 708 Market Street in Searcy, Arkansas.  It is a -story brick structure, with asymmetrical massing characteristic of the English Revival architecture.  A side gable roof has a large front-projecting gable with half-timbered stucco exterior, and the centered entrance is sheltered by a projecting brick gabled portico.  Built in 1928, it is the oldest of Searcy's English Revival houses, and among its most picturesque.

The house was listed on the National Register of Historic Places in 1992.

See also
National Register of Historic Places listings in White County, Arkansas

References

Houses on the National Register of Historic Places in Arkansas
Houses completed in 1928
Houses in Searcy, Arkansas
National Register of Historic Places in Searcy, Arkansas
Tudor Revival architecture in Arkansas
1928 establishments in Arkansas